Thompson McClellan (August 11, 1899 – February 24, 1975) was an American attorney and politician who served in the Mississippi House of Representatives. He represented Clay County on three separate occasions: first from 1924 to 1928, then from 1932 to 1936, and finally from 1956 to 1968. He was previously mayor of West Point from 1946 to 1953.

References

External links
 

Democratic Party members of the Mississippi House of Representatives
1899 births
1975 deaths
Mississippi lawyers
20th-century American politicians
20th-century American lawyers
United States Army personnel of World War I
United States Army soldiers